Bartosz Dzierżanowski (born September 5, 1986) is a Polish volleyball player. Since the 2018/2019 season, he has played for TKS Tychy

Sporting achievements

Clubs 
Polish First League Championship:
  2017
  2012

References

External links
 Siatkowka.MCKIS.Jaw profile
 Volleybox profile

1986 births
Living people
Polish men's volleyball players